Dermot Malone is an Irish Gaelic footballer, formerly for Monaghan county football team and Castleblayney Faughs. 

Malone was from Castleblayney, and had his senior Monaghan debut in 2010 and was in from the start for the Monaghan Ulster Senior final wins in both 2013 and 2015. He was the man of the match when Monaghan defeated Galway at the end of the Super 8s in 2018, to get an All Ireland Semi Final against Tyrone and put in his last appearance for Monaghan in the 2022 Ulster Senior final loss to Tyrone at Croke Park. He also played the Under 21 for Monaghan. Then he was injured and as a result of this he had to retire from inter-county football. The following year, in September 2022, he was selected as Monaghan minor manager. He also has a presence in the media.

References

Year of birth missing (living people)
Living people
Castleblayney Faughs Gaelic footballers
Gaelic football managers
Gaelic games writers and broadcasters
Monaghan inter-county Gaelic footballers